Al-Jadida is an album by the Lebanese oud player and composer Rabih Abou-Khalil, fusing traditional Arab music with jazz, which was recorded in 1990 and released on the Enja label the following year.

Reception

The AllMusic review by Ron Wynn stated "Rabih Abou-Khalil, among the rare Arabic musicians who have recorded and played extensively with jazz musicians, successfully navigates the middle ground between traditional North African sounds and hard bop. Besides the leader's oud and flute, alto saxophonist Sonny Fortune provides the blues bite; bassist Glen Moore, the rhythmic connection, and percussionists Ramesh Shotham and Nabil Khaiat, provide the African seasoning".

Track listing
All compositions by Rabih Abou-Khalil
 "Catania" – 7:41
 "Nashwa" – 9:33
 "An Evening with Jerry" – 6:59
 "When the Lights Go Out" – 7:14
 "Storyteller" – 8:52
 "Ornette Never Sleeps" – 4:01
 "Nadim" – 8:29
 "Wishing Well" – 5:25

Personnel
Rabih Abou-Khalil – oud
Sonny Fortune – alto saxophone
Glen Moore – bass
Ramesh Shotham – South Indian drums, percussion
Nabil Khaiat – frame drums

References

Rabih Abou-Khalil albums
1991 albums
Enja Records albums